The Memphis South Stars were a minor professional ice hockey team in Memphis, Tennessee, that replaced the Memphis Wings in the city. They played in the Central Professional Hockey League for two seasons (1967–68 and 1968–69) and were a farm team of the Minnesota North Stars of the National Hockey League.
In 1969 the team was moved to become the Iowa Stars in Waterloo, Iowa.

Season-by-season records

Central Hockey League
 Season    Games Won Lost Tied Points GoalsFor GoalsAgainst Standing     Playoffs 
 1967-68   70    24  34   12   60     206      249          3rd North    Lost Quarter Final 
 1968-69   72    14  41   17   45     208      304          4th North    out of playoffs

Memphis South Stars who played in the NHL
 Garry Bauman
 Ken Block
 Bob Charlebois
 Mike Chernoff
 Gary Dineen
 Sandy Fitzpatrick
 Germain Gagnon
 Bill Goldsworthy
 Murray Hall
 Don Johns
 Joey Johnston
 Al LeBrun
 Parker MacDonald
 Barry MacKenzie
 Milan Marcetta
 Ted McCaskill
 Barrie Meissner
 Lou Nanne
 Bill Plager
 Andre Pronovost
 Fern Rivard
 Danny Seguin
 Brian Smith
 George Standing
 Bill Sweeney
 Billy Taylor
 Leo Thiffault
 Carl Wetzel

References

South
Defunct ice hockey teams in the United States
Ice hockey teams in Tennessee
Central Professional Hockey League teams
1967 establishments in Tennessee
1969 disestablishments in Tennessee
Ice hockey clubs established in 1967
Sports clubs disestablished in 1969